Johann Deisenhofer (born September 30, 1943) is a German biochemist who, along with Hartmut Michel and Robert Huber, received the Nobel Prize for Chemistry in 1988 for their determination of the first crystal structure of an integral membrane protein, a membrane-bound complex of proteins and co-factors that is essential to photosynthesis.

Early life and education

Born in Bavaria, Deisenhofer earned his doctorate from the Technical University of Munich for research work done at the Max Planck Institute of Biochemistry in Martinsried, West Germany, in 1974. He conducted research there until 1988, when he joined the scientific staff of the Howard Hughes Medical Institute and the faculty of the Department of Biochemistry at The University of Texas Southwestern Medical Center at Dallas.

Career
Together with Michel and Huber, Deisenhofer determined the three-dimensional structure of a protein complex found in certain photosynthetic bacteria. This membrane protein complex, called a photosynthetic reaction center, was known to play a crucial role in initiating a simple type of photosynthesis. Between 1982 and 1985, the three scientists used X-ray crystallography to determine the exact arrangement of the more than 10,000 atoms that make up the protein complex. Their research increased the general understanding of the mechanisms of photosynthesis and revealed similarities between the photosynthetic processes of plants and bacteria.

Deisenhofer currently serves on the board of advisors of Scientists and Engineers for America, an organization focused on promoting sound science in American government. In 2003 he was one of 22 Nobel Laureates who signed the Humanist Manifesto. He is currently a professor at the Department of Biophysics at the University of Texas Southwestern Medical Center.

References

External links
 

1943 births
German biochemists
German biophysicists
German Nobel laureates
Howard Hughes Medical Investigators
Living people
Max Planck Society people
Members of the United States National Academy of Sciences
Nobel laureates in Chemistry
Technical University of Munich alumni
University of Texas Southwestern Medical Center faculty
Knights Commander of the Order of Merit of the Federal Republic of Germany
Researchers of photosynthesis